The Gainesville metropolitan area may refer to:

The Gainesville, Florida metropolitan area, United States
The Gainesville, Georgia metropolitan area, United States
The Gainesville, Texas micropolitan area, United States

See also
Gainesville (disambiguation)